Conrad Vernon (born July 11, 1968) is an American voice actor, director, writer, and storyboard artist best known for his work on the DreamWorks animated film series Shrek as well as other films such as Monsters vs. Aliens, Madagascar 3: Europe's Most Wanted, and Penguins of Madagascar. He also co-directed non-DreamWorks animated films such as Sony Pictures’ Sausage Party and MGM’s The Addams Family.

Life and career
Vernon, a native of Lubbock, Texas, studied at CalArts and worked as a storyboard artist for animated productions (including Ralph Bakshi's Cool World); he also directed Morto the Magician (a four-minute animated film written by Steve Martin).

In 1996, he joined DreamWorks, where he worked as a storyboard artist on Antz. After Antz proved a success as the first animated feature film to be produced by DreamWorks Animation, Vernon signed on as a writer for Shrek, where he was responsible for the Gingerbread Man, and eventually voiced that character. He also appeared in Shrek 4-D and Sinbad: Legend of the Seven Seas.

In June 2004, he made his feature film directorial debut with the Academy Award nominated Shrek 2. He voiced Mason the chimpanzee for the DreamWorks Animation films Madagascar, Madagascar: Escape 2 Africa, Madagascar 3: Europe's Most Wanted (for which he is also credited as director) and its spin off Penguins of Madagascar (where he voiced Rico, one of the penguins) and reprised the voice of Mason in the television series.

In 2009, Vernon and Rob Letterman co-directed the 3D animated film Monsters vs. Aliens, which he co wrote as well as supplying several voices.

Vernon and Greg Tiernan co-directed the adult animated comedy Sausage Party (2016), from a story by Seth Rogen, Evan Goldberg, and Jonah Hill, as well as providing some of the voices. Vernon next co-produced and co-directed, again with Tiernan, an animated version of The Addams Family, which was released in October 2019. He supplied voice roles for both Sausage Party and The Addams Family, including Lurch in the latter. He was scheduled to return as director alongside Tiernan for The Addams Family 2, released in October 2021. In October 2020, it was announced that he would no longer be involved as director, though he ultimately received co-billing with Tiernan.

In 2017, Vernon was hired to direct an animated feature adaptation of The Jetsons, from a screenplay by Matt Lieberman, which is being made by Warner Bros., under its Warner Animation Group banner.

Filmography

Film

Acting roles

Other credits

Television

Acting roles

References

External links
Conrad's blog

1968 births
Living people
American animated film directors
Animators from Texas
American male voice actors
People from Lubbock, Texas
California Institute of the Arts alumni
DreamWorks Animation people
American storyboard artists
American television directors
American male television writers
American television writers
Film directors from Texas
Screenwriters from Texas